Artek is an international children's center (a former Young Pioneer camp) on the Black Sea in the town of Gurzuf located on the Crimean Peninsula, near Ayu-Dag. It was established on 16 June 1925.

The camp first hosted only 80 children but then grew rapidly. In 1969 it had an area of 3.2 km2 (790 acres). The camp consisted of 150 buildings, including three medical facilities, a school, the film studio Artekfilm, three swimming pools, a stadium with a seating capacity of 7,000 and playgrounds for various other activities. Unlike most of the young pioneer camps, Artek was an all-year camp, due to the warm climate.

Artek was considered to be a privilege for Soviet children during its existence, as well as for children from other communist countries. During its heyday, 27,000 children a year vacationed at Artek. Between 1925 and 1969 the camp hosted 300,000 children including more than 13,000 children from 70 foreign countries. After the breaking up of the Young Pioneers in 1991 its prestige declined, though it remained a popular vacation destination.

History

Soviet era

Artek consisted of a total of ten smaller camps. Each of them had its own name: Morskoi, Lazurny, Kiparisny, etc. Four of these camps (Rechnoi, Ozyorny, Lesnoi and Polevoi)  made up the notable Pribrezhny complex of Artek built between 1960 and 1964. The group of architects, led by Anatoly Polyansky, that designed Pribrezhny was awarded the USSR State Prize in architecture in 1967.

Similar distinguished pioneer camps were maintained by several Soviet republics, e.g., Orlyonok in Russian SFSR and Zubryonok on Byelorussian SSR.
In East Germany the Ernst Thälmann Pioneer Organisation built a pioneer camp similar to Artek in 1952 at Werbellinsee north-east of Berlin.

2000s

The center was part of the Ukraine's State Management of Affairs. 60% of visitors arrive on a state subsidized or free basis. The beneficiaries are children from low income and large families, as well as orphans, handicapped and gifted children. In 2005 full prices were in the range of 3,000-5,000 UAH, depending on the season and location. 2007 prices were from US$770 to about $2000.

In 2004 it was officially recognized by UNESCO as a site for the implementation of international projects and in particular during the UN Decade of Education (2005–2014).

2005 was the year of Artek's 80th anniversary and the camp hosted about 13,000 children in educational camps under the supervision of about 2,000 of volunteer squad leaders managed by permanent pedagogical staff of over 200 under the command of general director Olga Guzar (Ольга Владимировна Гузар).

Traditionally Artek provided a base (known as a School of Pedagogues-Organizers) for hands-on training of students of pedagogical schools. This tradition has been continued today and the camp is known as the "Humanitarian Institute 'Artek'". In 2005 students from Ukraine, Russia, Belarus, Moldova and Kazakhstan were trained there.

As of late 2008 Artek was in financial trouble, which was solved when the Ukrainian Parliament passed laws early February 2009 writing off more than $2 million in debt (and more in unpaid taxes), barred privatization of the camp's land and obliged government agencies to pay the expenses of 15,000 children each year.

Artek since the 2014 Russian annexation of Crimea
 
Early in 2014 season, following the 2014 Russian annexation of Crimea, the staff of the camp officially moved from Crimea to Bukovel in the Carpathian Mountains. The new center there was named International Children Center "Artek-Carpathians" and consisted of three camps "Lake", "Forest" and "Mountain."

Meanwhile, the original site in Crimea remained open. In October 2014, the Russian government allocated 21 billion rubles (US$568 million) for reconstruction and development. On June 16, 2014, by the decree of the Government of the Russian Federation, the federal state budgetary educational institution "International Children's Center "Artek" was established. 
The functions of the founder were transferred to the Ministry of Education and Science of the Russian Federation, and a draft program for the development of the center was prepared. During the open discussion of the draft Concept, 894 expert opinions were received. In accordance with the final document which was presented on October 8, 2014 in Moscow, in addition to recreation the innovative educational activities were identified as a priority area of the center's work. In the autumn of 2014, Artek started work on the improvement of the territory, reconstruction and major buildings repairs. About 5 billion rubles were allocated from the Russian budget for the reconstruction of Artek. In 2014-2015, a large-scale reconstruction of the camp was implemented. It is included completion of unfinished buildings, construction of new buildings and other infrastructure facilities. Inside the buildings service lines were changed, new furniture was delivered, the dining room was restored, and a sports ground was equipped with wide rage of sports equipment. The swimming pools were also renovated, and the camp was equipped with modern computers. On February 27, 2015, 4 buildings of the camp "Lazurny" were put into operation.
There are three ways to get to Artek: for special achievements in science, culture, sports; winning a competition of a partner organization; or for an amount exceeding 80,000 rubles.

In 2014, Artek hosted 5854 children, in 2015 – 18858, in 2016-31200, in 2017 – 39000, in 2018 – 40000 children, in 2019 – 44025 children, in 2020-17287 children (reduced capacity due to the COVID-19 pandemic) from different regions of the Russian Federation and abroad. This numbers include more than 6,300 children from 87 countries visited Artek from 2014 to 2020.

Artek during the 2022 Russian invasion of Ukraine 

During the 2022 Russian invasion of Ukraine, Ukrainian children between the age of 6 and 16 from occupied parts of Ukraine were being held at the Artek camp against the will of their parents.  The children were being taught the Russian narrative about the war, including the claim that the Kherson and Zaporizhzhia oblasts had been annexed and were therefore parts of Russia, and that the Ukrainian-controlled parts of these oblasts were being "occupied" by Ukraine.

In October 2022, the Russian news agency TASS stated that there were around 4,500 children from the Kherson and Zaporizhzhia oblasts on Crimean summer camps.

According to Russian authorities, the children were being saved from the "special military operation" that Russia started in order to "liberate" Ukraine.  According to Ukraine’s human right’s ombudsman, Dmytro Lubinets, this was a part of a Russian effort to erase Ukrainian identity.

Notable visitors
Among honorary guests of Artek were:

Controversies
In 1952, Turkish poet Nâzım Hikmet visited the Cypress camp in Artek, where he was appalled to realize he stepped on a former gravestone with a verse of the Quran facing up; years earlier, numerous Muslim cemeteries in Crimea were dismantled after the ethnic cleansing of Crimean Tatars by the Soviet regime, with the gravestones and pieces of them used as bricks.

Only until Hikmet complained was that particular gravestone brick facing up removed, but for many years it was not considered objectionable by the many Soviet visitors of the camp who saw nothing wrong with stepping on the tombstone or simply ignored it.

In 2009, a criminal case was opened after several children stated they were raped in the camp. Three deputies of the Verkhovna Rada (Ukrainian parliament) and a priest are involved in this case according to BYuT Rada deputy Hryhoriy Omelchenko. On 21 May 2010, a Verkhovna Rada commission investigating these allegations was disbanded after it failed to find enough evidence to proceed.

See also
Orlyonok
Samantha Smith, the young American peace activist who visited Artek

References

External links

The International Children Center Artek, official homepage.
Four weeks in Artek
Representative office of the International Children Center Artek in Kiev.

1925 establishments in the Soviet Union
Buildings and structures built in the Soviet Union
Young Pioneer camps
Organizations based in Crimea
Buildings and structures in Crimea
Gurzuf